Norberto Conde (14 March 1931 – 8 September 2014) was an Argentine footballer. He was capped by the Argentina national team between 1955 and 1958, scoring three goals.

Career statistics

International

International goals
Scores and results list Argentina's goal tally first.

References

1931 births
2014 deaths
Argentine footballers
Argentine expatriate footballers
Argentina international footballers
Association football midfielders
Club Atlético Vélez Sarsfield footballers
Club Atlético Huracán footballers
Club Atlético Atlanta footballers
Ferro Carril Oeste footballers
América de Cali footballers
Argentine expatriate sportspeople in Colombia
Expatriate footballers in Colombia
Footballers from Buenos Aires